The 31st National Hockey League All-Star Game was held at the Buffalo Memorial Auditorium in Buffalo, home of the Buffalo Sabres, on January 24, 1978. Wales Conference All-Star team defeated the Campbell Conference for the fourth consecutive year. Gilbert Perreault scored with 1:05 left in sudden death overtime for the winning goal. This was the first all star game to be played with an overtime period.  The most valuable player award went to goaltender Billy Smith who stopped 16 shots in the first 30 minutes of the game.

Team Lineups

Game summary

Goaltenders : 
 Wales  : Dryden (29:26 minutes), Vachon (34:29 minutes).
 Campbell : Smith (29:26 minutes), Stephenson (34:29 minutes).

Shots on goal : 
Wales (40) 07 - 16 - 15 - 02
Campbell (12) 07 - 02 - 03 - 00

Referee : Bruce Hood

Linesmen : John D'Amico, Leon Stickle

See also
1977–78 NHL season

References
 

All
National Hockey League All-Star Games
National Hockey League All-Star Game
National Hockey League All-Star Game